S57 may refer to:
 S57 (Long Island bus)
 S57 (New York City bus) serving Staten Island
 , a submarine of the Royal Australian Navy
 , a submarine of the Indian Navy
 Prince Skyline (S57), a Japanese automobile
 S57: Use appropriate containment to avoid environmental contamination, a safety phrase
 Savoia-Marchetti S.57, an Italian flying boat
 Sikorsky S-57, a planned experimental American aircraft
 Siemens S57, a Siemens mobile phone